Profile Portrait of a Lady is oil on panel painting by an unknown Franco-Flemish artist, dated to about 1410. It is housed in the National Gallery of Art, Washington.

The woman is wearing an early form balzo headdress over her hair, which has been plucked above her forehead to the point at which the balzo rests.

References

Notes

Sources

Bibliography

 Hand, John Oliver and Martha Wolff. Early Netherlandish Painting. The Collections of the National Gallery of Art Systematic Catalogue. Washington, 1986: 90–97, repro. 91.
 Panofsky Erwin. Early Netherlandish Painting: Its Origins and Character. 2 vols. Cambridge, Mass., 1953: 1:82, 171, 392 note 2; 2: pl. 43, fig. 92.
 Sterling, Charles. La peinture de portrait à la cour de Bourgogne au début du XVe siècle. Critica d'Arte 6, 1959: 289, 299, 304,306, 308, 312, fig 193.
 Virtue and Beauty: Leonardo's Ginevra de' Benci and Renaissance Portraits of Women. Exh. cat. National Gallery of Art, Washington, 2001–2002: no. 1.

Further reading

 Hand, John Oliver. National Gallery of Art: Master Paintings from the Collection. Washington and New York, 2004: 72–73, no. 53, color repro.

External links
 Catalogue entry at the National Gallery of Art

Early Netherlandish paintings
Collections of the National Gallery of Art
1410s paintings
Portraits of women